is a railway station in Naka-ku, Hamamatsu,  Shizuoka Prefecture, Japan, operated by the private railway company, Enshū Railway.

Lines
Enshūbyōin Station is a station on the  Enshū Railway Line and is 0.8 kilometers from the starting point of the line at Shin-Hamamatsu Station.

Station layout
The station has dual opposed elevated side platforms, with the station building located underneath. It is staffed during daylight hours. The station building has automated ticket machines, and automated turnstiles which accept the NicePass smart card, as well as ET Card, a magnetic card ticketing system.

Platforms

Adjacent stations

|-
!colspan=5|Enshū Railway

Station History
The current Shin-Hamamatsu Station is located on what was formerly the rail yard. In April 2007, the Enshū Hospital, after which the station was named, was relocated; however, the station name was not changed.

Passenger statistics
In fiscal 2017, the station was used by an average of 995 passengers daily (boarding passengers only).

Surrounding area
Shizuoka University of Art and Culture

See also
 List of railway stations in Japan

References

External links

 Enshū Railway official website

Railway stations in Japan opened in 1958
Railway stations in Shizuoka Prefecture
Railway stations in Hamamatsu
Stations of Enshū Railway